The National Fortifications Heritage is a division with the Norwegian Defence Estates Agency responsible for sixteen military fortifications in Norway designated as heritage sites. The agency is responsible for conserving the character and history of the sites, while facilitating their use for culture, business and experiences. The list consists of ten fortresses, four smaller forts and two networks of border fortifications. Three fortresses, Akershus, Bergenshus and Vardøhus, date from the Middle Ages. Five installations date from the union with Denmark and five were built either union with Sweden or following the dissolution, as a defense against a Swedish invasion. Three forts, Austrått, Møvik and Trondenes, were built by the German Wehrmacht during World War II as part of Festung Norwegen.

Three of the fortifications, Akershus, Bergenshus and Karljohansvern, continue to be in regular use by the military; Akershus features the Ministry of Defence and the headquarters of the Norwegian Armed Forces. The agency has carried out work to improve public access and cultural use of the venues. Most of the facilities represent recreational areas for locals and museums have been established at most of the facilities. Oscarsborg has received an opera stage, while Kongsvinger has been partially converted to conference center. The fortifications had a combined two million visitors in 2008. Some of the installations are frequently used for concerts and other cultural events. Costs of maintenance is split between rental income from events and tenants, and government grants.

A government report in 1992 proposed that fourteen selected fortresses be made more accessible to the public, and in part be made tourist attractions, through a military and civilian cooperation. Responsibility for the sites was transferred to the National Fortifications Heritage, when it was established as a division within the Norwegian Defence Estates Agency. The same year the ministry proposed that disused installations from the Cold War also be added to the list. A conservation plan for each fortification was created the following year.

Fortifications

References

Forts in Norway
Military and war museums in Norway
1992 establishments in Norway